Eriochloa is a widespread genus of plants in the grass family, commonly called cupgrass. They are found across much of Africa, Asia, Australia, and the Americas, plus a few places in European Russia.

 Species
 Eriochloa acuminata – tapertip cupgrass - Mexico, southern USA (from CA to MD + FL), northern Argentina 
 Eriochloa aristata – bearded cupgrass - Mexico, USA (AZ, CA, MS) 
 Eriochloa australiensis - Australia 
 Eriochloa boliviensis - Bolivia 
 Eriochloa boxiana  - Mexico, Central America, Lesser Antilles, Colombia, Venezuela 
 Eriochloa contracta – prairie cupgrass - Mexico, USA (from CA to FL to MN), Ontario 
 Eriochloa crebra - Australia 
 Eriochloa distachya - Central + South America 
 Eriochloa fatmensis – tropical cupgrass - sub-Saharan Africa, Madagascar, Arabian Peninsula 
 Eriochloa grandiflora - Santa Cruz in Bolivia, Paraguay, Misiones in Argentina, Minas Gerais in Brazil 
 Eriochloa lemmonii – canyon cupgrass - USA (AZ, NM), northern + central Mexico 
 Eriochloa macclounii  - Tanzania, Malawi, Zambia, Zimbabwe, Mozambique, Botswana  
 Eriochloa meyeriana - sub-Saharan Africa, Aldabra, Madagascar, Yemen 
 Eriochloa michauxii – long-leaved cupgrass - USA (AL FL GA SC) 
 Eriochloa montevidensis - Uruguay, Paraguay, Brazil, Bolivia, Chile, Argentina, Ecuador 
 Eriochloa nana - Argentina (Formosa, Corrientes, Santiago del Estero) 
 Eriochloa nelsonii - Mexico, Central America 
 Eriochloa pacifica - Peru, Ecuador incl Galápagos 
 Eriochloa parvispiculata - Kenya, Tanzania, Mozambique, Malawi, Eswatini, Limpopo, Mpumalanga, KwaZulu-Natal 
 Eriochloa peruviana - Peru, Ecuador  
 Eriochloa polystachya – caribgrass - Chiapas, Central America, West Indies, northern South America 
 Eriochloa procera - Australia, New Guinea, southeast Asia, China, Indian Subcontinent, East Africa 
 Eriochloa pseudoacrotricha - Australia 
 Eriochloa punctata – Louisiana cupgrass - Central America, West Indies, South America, Mexico, USA (TX LA GA MD) 
 Eriochloa rovumensis - Tanzania, Mozambique 
 Eriochloa sericea – Texas cupgrass  - USA (TX OK KS), Coahuila, Tamaulipas 
 Eriochloa setosa - Cuba 
 Eriochloa stapfiana - Madagascar, Kenya, Tanzania, Mozambique, Eswatini, Limpopo, Mpumalanga, KwaZulu-Natal 
 Eriochloa stevensii - Costa Rica, Nicaragua, Ecuador, Venezuela, Peru 
 Eriochloa subulifera - Aldabra, Madagascar 
 Eriochloa succincta - southern European Russia, Caucasus, Iran, Iraq, Kazakhstan, Uzbekistan, Turkmenistan, Tajikistan 
 Eriochloa tridentata - Brazil, Bolivia, Argentina 
 Eriochloa villosa – hairy cupgrass - Russia (Amur, Primorye, Khabarovsk), China incl Taiwan, Korea, Vietnam, Japan incl Ryukyu Is 
 Eriochloa weberbaueri - Peru, Ecuador

 formerly included
see Ancistrachne Axonopus Brachiaria Isachne Panicum Paspalum Tricholaena Urochloa

References

Panicoideae
Poaceae genera